Laurel Highlands Council serves youth in Allegheny, Beaver, Bedford, Blair, Cambria, Greene, Indiana, Somerset, and Washington counties in Pennsylvania; Grant, Hampshire, Hardy, and Mineral counties in West Virginia; and Allegany and Garrett counties of Maryland.

History
In 1914, four years after the Scouting Movement was launched in the United States, the Allegheny County Council was chartered by the Boy Scouts of America. The Philadelphia Council was also chartered in 1914. In 1921 the council was split into seven separate council units: the Allegheny Council, Allegheny Valley Council, Chartiers Council (McKees Rocks), East Boroughs Council (Wilkinsburg; merged with Mon-Yough Council in 1973), Guyasuta Council (Aspinwall), Ohio Valley Council, Pittsburgh Council, and South Hills Council (merged with Pittsburgh Council, 1928, to become Allegheny County Council, West).

In 1967, the former Nemacolin Trails Council in Washington, Pennsylvania, merged with the Allegheny Council in Pittsburgh to become the Allegheny Trails Council. This council merged again in 1993 with East Valley Area Council Forest Hills to become the former Greater Pittsburgh Council.

Greater Pittsburgh Council and Penn's Woods Council merged on July 1, 2011 to form Laurel Highlands Council. Potomac Council was absorbed into Laurel Highlands Council in early 2014.

Allegheny County Council

Allegheny Council

Allegheny Valley Council

Chartiers Council

East Boroughs Council

Mon-Yough Council

Guyasuta Council

Ohio Valley Council

East Valley Area Council

Pittsburgh Council

South Hills Council

Allegheny County Council, West

Nemacolin Trails Council

Allegheny Trails Council
Allegheny Trails Council was around from 1967-1992. Allegheny Trails Council serviced half of Allegheny, Beaver County, Greene County and, Washington County

Greater Pittsburgh Council
Following the merge of area councils the HQ for the New Council was the flag plaza near the old Mellon Arena and the new Consol Energy center.

Penn's Woods Council
In 1970, Blair-Bedford Area Council, William Penn Council, and Admiral Robert E. Peary Council, merged into Penn's Woods Council. Its headquarters was in Ebensburg.

Potomac Council

Camps

Camp Anawanna
Camp Anawanna is nestled in the foothills of rural Washington County, between Amity and Prosperity. It is 1 hour and 20 minutes south of Pittsburgh.  Anawanna offers some weekend cabins and tent camping.

Camp Baker
Camp Baker located right next to Blackhawk High School in Chippewa, Beaver County. A bare bones camp without cabins and only adirondacks.

Camp Guyasuta
Camp Guyasuta, located in Allegheny County between Aspinwall and Sharpsburg near the banks of the Allegheny River, was established in 1918. Mary Darlington, great-granddaughter of James O'Hara, lived in a house (named "Guyasuta") on the land at the time but was forced to vacate the property during World War I when the Federal government took over the railroad lines as part of the war effort. While the government acquired the land it needed, Mary subsequently gave the Boy Scouts over 100 additional acres suitable for a camp. When she died in 1925, Mary's will officially bequeathed the land to the Scouting organization.

Heritage Reservation

Heritage Reservation is located in Farmington, Pennsylvania,  Heritage opened in 1980 and is located in southwestern Pennsylvania. Heritage Reservation's primary season is summer, however it does offer other camping options throughout the year.

Camps
The reservation consists of four camps:
 Camp Independence— Cub Scout camp
 Eagle Base— Boy Scout and Venturing High Adventure camp
 Camp Liberty— Boy Scout camp
 Camp Freedom— Boy Scout camp

Camp Liberty functions using the Patrol Method, Scouts working within their patrols to cook meals, and is more troop-centric.

Camp Freedom and Independence are functionally more camp-centric models, as all meals and many events are centralized within the camp.

All four camps offer various activities and merit badge opportunities that vary based on age appropriateness, Scout Rank and weather.

Summer Activities
Boy Scouts

Cub Scouts

Webelos Scouts

Winter Activities

Camp Potomac
Camp Potomac is a rustic 114-acre Boy Scout Resident Camp located in Oldtown, Maryland, operated by the Laurel Highlands Council, Boy Scouts of America. There are three cabins and eight campsites available for camping. It was founded in 1951.

Camp Potomac is perfectly located to provide a base camp for trips to Green Ridge State Forest, the C&O Canal Towpath, the Potomac River, as well as a huge number of other attractions in the Western Maryland, Potomac Highlands of West Virginia, and Southwestern Pennsylvania areas.

Camp Seph Mack
Camp Seph Mack is located on Yellow Creek Lake near Penn Run, PA, and is one of the council camps of the Laurel Highlands Council, Boy Scouts of America. Laurel Highlands, BSA, is headquartered in Pittsburgh, PA, and serves approximately 30,000 youth and their families from an twelve-county area in south western Pennsylvania.

Camp Seph Mack encompasses approximately 200 acres within the boundaries of Yellow Creek State Park and lies along the north shore with of almost 4,000 feet of lake frontage.

Camp Seph Mack takes its name from the late J. Sephus Mack of Indiana, the patriarch of the family that originally donated much of this land for youth activities in the 1930s. The William Penn Council, a predecessor to Laurel Highlands, first operated Seph Mack as a Boy Scout Camp in the late 1940s. The camp ceased operation in the late 1960s and was sold to the Commonwealth of Pennsylvania as part of the development of Yellow Creek State Park. An organization titled William Penn Inc. was created to administer the investments made with the proceeds of that sale.

In 1970, William Penn, Admiral Peary and Blair-Bedford Councils were merged to form Penn's Woods Council. In 1980, Penn's Woods Council reacquired the camp through a long-term lease agreement with the Pennsylvania Department of Parks and the Department of Environmental Resources. In 2011 the Penn's Wood Council merged with the Greater Pittsburgh Council to form the Laurel Highlands Council.

Today, William Penn Inc. is a major contributor to Laurel Highlands Council, providing donations from its investment income as seed money for capital improvement projects. In 1999 and 2000, with the support of William Penn Inc., a first-rate shower facility was constructed at Seph Mack for the use of the campers and guests of Laurel Highlands Council.

Camp Seph Mack has seen many changes, and additions, over its storied history. Although the camp is open year round for camping and adventure, it is most popular for its summer camp programs. Seph Mack hosted more than 1,000 Scouts during the summer in a variety of programs for youth of all ages, from the Cub Scout Day Camp program in mid-June, through the Boy Scout Resident program of late June to early August, and Webelos/Cub Resident Camp the week after. All of the programs were planned and supervised by a Nationally Accredited Camp Staff and provide age-appropriate activities. The council ceased operating the summer camp after the 2019 season.

Camp Seph Mack is particularly proud of a waterfront and aquatics program. The waterfront and aquatic area was regraded and improved when the State drew down the water level of the Lake during the winter of 1999-2000. Through a generous contribution of a Scouting supporter, Laurel Highlands was able to purchase a large pontoon boat, christened the Jolly Roger in honor of our benefactor, which can be used for teaching power boat safety or for taking groups of Scouts to new and different fishing spots around the Lake. Sailboats, rowboats, canoes and kayaks are an integral part of our waterfront. Swimming, snorkeling and lifesaving are just a few of the other activities that are offered.

Traditional advancement programs are available throughout the camping season. Additionally, Sprint Troop, a specialized program for Scouts working on Second and First Class ranks, is available to usually first year scouts. Camp Seph Mack provides opportunities for many merit badges; camping, hiking, wilderness survival, nature, fishing and the shooting sports are available. Seph Mack has programs in astronomy and space exploration, canoeing and small boat sailing, athletics, and handicrafts of all kinds. After the closure of Camp Twin Echo, the National Youth Leadership Training Conference (NYLT), Twin Arrow, was moved to Camp Seph Mack, starting in 2021.

Camp Seph Mack also serves as a training facility for adult leaders during the summer season. Training for adult leaders in Health and Safety, Youth Protection, Troop Leadership, Safety Afloat and a number of other topics is made available so that our adults can provide a better year-round program for the youth.

But, Camp Seph Mack is open to more than just Scouting groups. In the past few years, Seph Mack has hosted Native American Festivals, SCUBA training programs, fishing and boating clubs, business meetings, military units and family reunions. The camp’s various facilities may be rented or donated, depending on the nature of the event and the length of each program.

The Council has made a number of capital improvements to Camp Seph Mack over the past three years. The Council’s strategic vision will continue the building projects over the next 5–10 years.

Camp Twin Echo
Camp Twin Echo was a scout camp near Ligoner, PA and was owned by the Laurel Highlands Council. It was sold in late 2020 and is no longer being used as a scout camp.

Order of the Arrow

The Order of the Arrow is represented by the Allohak Menewi Lodge. It supports the Scouting programs of the council through leadership, camping, and service.

References

Local councils of the Boy Scouts of America
Northeast Region (Boy Scouts of America)
Organizations based in Pittsburgh